The Topaz Taz is a sailing dinghy created by Topper International designed for between 1 or 2 children. The Taz is an ISAF ‘Learn to Sail’ class.

Performance and design
The Taz is an easy to sail, two-sail dinghy designed for one or two children (or an adult and a child). Designed by Ian Howlett, the Taz is built with a trilam construction with a choice of a dacron or mylar sail.

References

External links
 Topper International - Taz

Dinghies
Sailboat types built by Topper International